Me Me Lai (born 3 November 1951), sometimes billed as Me Me Lay or Meme Lay, is a Burmese-British actress and television host who worked mainly in British and Italian films, most notably in the horror genre.

Life
She was born on the night of 3 November 1951 in Burma to a Burmese mother and an English father. She moved to England in her teens, where she soon started her acting career, at first in television series like Paul Temple and Jason King. Soon, she made the transition to acting in movies, starting with the 1971 Mike Raven horror movie Crucible of Terror, soon followed by the 1972 sex comedy Au Pair Girls directed by Val Guest.

Lai came into her own during the era of Italian cannibal films, playing lead roles in two genre-defining movies: Man from Deep River (1972) by Umberto Lenzi, and Last Cannibal World (1977) by Ruggero Deodato. Additionally, she also had a part in Eaten Alive! (1980), again by Umberto Lenzi, in which one of her scenes from Last Cannibal World was re-used. Outside the cannibal genre, she had a brief role as a Chinese brothel girl in Blake Edwards's 1978 comedy Revenge of the Pink Panther.

Me Me Lai also was co-hostess of British game shows The Golden Shot and Sale of the Century, and appeared on the 1970s Yorkshire Television programme Origami, with Robert Harbin.

Her last movie was Lars von Trier's The Element of Crime in 1984. She later joined the Essex police force.

Filmography
 She'll Follow You Anywhere (1971) - Bride
 Crucible of Terror (1971) - Chi-San
 Au Pair Girls (1972) - Nan Lee 
 The Man from Deep River (1972) - Marayå 
 Last Cannibal World (1977) - Pulan
 Revenge of the Pink Panther (1978) - Chinese Lady of Easy Virtue
 Licensed to Love and Kill (1979) - Female Madam Wang
 Eaten Alive! (1980) - Mowara
 The Element of Crime (1984) - Kim

Television appearances
 Paul Temple (1970) - Masseuse
 Hine (1971) - Miss Mini
 Spearhead (1981) - Mimi
 The Optimist (1983) - Karate Girl

References

Further reading

External links

1951 births
Living people
Anglo-Burmese people
British actresses of Asian descent
English television actresses
English film actresses
English people of Burmese descent
British women police officers